Yosuke Kawai (河井 陽介, born 4 August 1989) is a Japanese football player for Fagiano Okayama.

Career statistics

Club
Updated to 18 February 2019.

1Includes Emperor's Cup.
2Includes J. League Cup.

References

External links
Profile at Shimizu S-Pulse

1989 births
Living people
Keio University alumni
Association football people from Shizuoka Prefecture
Japanese footballers
J1 League players
J2 League players
Shimizu S-Pulse players
Fagiano Okayama players
Association football midfielders
Universiade gold medalists for Japan
Universiade medalists in football
People from Fujieda, Shizuoka
Medalists at the 2011 Summer Universiade